Wildwood is a gated community and census-designated place in Hardin and Tyler counties, Texas, United States. As of the 2020 census it had a population of 1,121. The Hardin county portion of Wildwood is part of the Beaumont–Port Arthur Metropolitan Statistical Area.

Geography
Wildwood is built around Lake Kimball, a reservoir on Kimball Creek, a tributary of Village Creek and part of the Neches River watershed.

Demographics 

As of the 2020 United States census, there were 1,121 people, 352 households, and 253 families residing in the CDP.

Recreation
Lake Kimball provides the opportunity for Wildwood residents to enjoy boating, fishing, and water skiing. There are also an 18-hole golf course, a tennis court, baseball field, and basketball court. Residents enjoy a man-made beach and swimming area. Close to the beach is a small park with playground equipment and picnic tables.

Schools
The Warren Independent School District (Tyler County) and Kountze Independent School District (Hardin County) serve area students.

Churches
Two churches serve the community. The Wildwood Village Mills United Methodist Church is located just outside the community gate, while Wildwood Baptist Church is located inside the gated community.

See also
John Henry Kirby

References

External links
 Wildwood Resort City, property owners' association
 Village Mills entry at Handbook of Texas online

Census-designated places in Hardin County, Texas
Census-designated places in Tyler County, Texas
Beaumont–Port Arthur metropolitan area